Sally Shapiro is the pseudonym of a Swedish vocalist and the name of the Italo disco/synthpop duo composed of Shapiro and musician Johan Agebjörn. On 28 April 2016, Sally Shapiro announced the end of their 10-year career alongside the release of the final single "If You Ever Wanna Change Your Mind". They returned from retirement in January 2018 for a collaboration with Ryan Paris called "Love On Ice". In 2021, they signed with Italians Do It Better and announced the 2022 release of their fourth studio album Sad Cities.

History 
Shapiro grew up listening to Swedish pop and disco and the band was influenced by Eurobeat and Italo disco. Agebjörn shed some light on the choice of the fictional stage name in an October 2007 interview with Exclaim! magazine:

Sally Shapiro's debut album, 2007's Disco Romance, was produced by Agebjörn. The album received strong reviews, and Shapiro was championed by many prominent music blogs including Pitchfork Media. The album was released in North America on 16 October 2007 by Canadian-based indie label Paper Bag Records; it is a ten-track album featuring artwork by Canadian designer Geoff Wilson.

Shapiro is notable for shunning publicity and has never revealed her real name. However, in an interview with Swedish webzine Judy in September 2007, she talked for the first time about considering performing live:

In spring 2008, Sally Shapiro went on a short DJ tour, but on a February 2009 post on Sally Shapiro's Myspace blog, Agebjörn stated that Sally would not perform again:

On 15 April 2008, Sally Shapiro's remix album Remix Romance Vol. 1 was released worldwide by Paper Bag Records. Some of the names on this remix album are Junior Boys, Jon Brooks, Lindstrøm, Holy Fuck and Juan Maclean.

Quickly following Vol. 1, Remix Romance Vol. 2 was released on 17 June 2008. It contains remixes by Dntel, The Russian Futurists, Solvent and Alexander Robotnick. This volume is only available as a download.

Sally Shapiro's single "Miracle" was released on 16 June 2009. It is similar in style to previous Shapiro singles.

Their second studio album, My Guilty Pleasure, was released in August 2009. Like the previous work, it was recorded alone.

In 2011, the duo revealed that they had been working on new material to be released in the near future. In 2012, they officially announced their third album, "Somewhere Else", which was released on 26 February 2013. The album was produced by Agebjörn, and featured collaborations with Cloetta Paris' Roger Gunnarsson and Le Prix. The album's leading single, "What Can I Do", was released in December 2012.

In June 2021, the duo released a new single, "Fading Away." A new album entitled Sad Cities was released on 18 February 2022.

Discography

Studio albums 
 Disco Romance (2006)
 My Guilty Pleasure (2009)
 Somewhere Else (2013)
 Sad Cities (2022)

Compilation albums 
 The Collection (2016)

Remix albums 
 Remix Romance Vol. 1 (2008)
 Remix Romance Vol. 2 (2008)
 My Guilty Pleasure – Remixes (2010)
 Elsewhere (2013)
 Sweetened (2013)

Singles 
 "I'll Be By Your Side" (2006)
 "Anorak Christmas" (2006)
 "Jackie Jackie (Spend This Winter with Me)" (2008)
 "Spacer Woman from Mars" (with Johan Agebjörn, Rude 66 and Elitechnique) (2008)
 "He Keeps Me Alive" (2008)
 "Miracle" (2009)
 "Love in July" (2009)
 "The Explorers" (CFCF featuring Sally Shapiro) (2009)
 "Don't Be Afraid" (Anoraak featuring Sally Shapiro) (2010)
 "Casablanca Nights" (Johan Agebjörn featuring Lovelock & Sally Shapiro) (2011)
 "Alice" (Johan Agebjörn featuring Le Prix, Fred Ventura & Sally Shapiro) (2011)
 "Spacer Woman From Mars" (Johan Agebjörn featuring Sally Shapiro) (2011)
 "What Can I Do" (2012)
 "Starman (featuring Electric Youth)" (2013)
 "If You Ever Wanna Change Your Mind" (2016)
 "Fading Away" (2021)
 "Forget About You" (2021)

References

External links 
Official website
Sally Shapiro's MySpace
Johan Agebjörn website
DISKOKAINE is Sally's Label Worldwide except North America
Paper Bag Records is Sally's Label in North America
Audiojunkies Interview with Sally Shapiro
Judy.se interview with Sally Shapiro, in Swedish
Swedish Dancing Queen Comes to Canada AOL Music Canada article
Sally Shapiro article November 2007
Venus Zine article
Just Mag interview
Out article
Dummy interview
Stream: "The Leftovers" (with Loney Dear)

Electronic music duos
Italo disco groups
Musical groups established in 2006
Paper Bag Records artists
Swedish synthpop groups
Swedish musical duos
Male–female musical duos